Ana Paula Scheffer (18 August 198916 October 2020) was a Brazilian individual rhythmic gymnast.

She represented her nation at international competitions. She competed at world championships, including at the 2009 World Rhythmic Gymnastics Championships.

Scheffer was discovered dead at her home in Toledo, Paraná suffering from heart attack on October 16, 2020, aged 31.

References

1989 births
2020 deaths
Brazilian rhythmic gymnasts
Place of birth missing
Gymnasts at the 2007 Pan American Games
Pan American Games medalists in gymnastics
Pan American Games bronze medalists for Brazil
South American Games gold medalists for Brazil
South American Games silver medalists for Brazil
South American Games medalists in gymnastics
Competitors at the 2006 South American Games
Competitors at the 2010 South American Games
Medalists at the 2007 Pan American Games
People from Toledo, Paraná
Sportspeople from Paraná (state)
21st-century Brazilian women